Osenovlag Island is the easternmost island in the Onogur group off the northwest coast of Robert Island in the South Shetland Islands, Antarctica. It is named after the settlement of Osenovlag in Western Bulgaria.

Description
The area was visited by early 19th century sealers.

The island is named after the settlement of Osenovlag in Western Bulgaria. British mapping took place in 1968 and Bulgarian mapping in 2009.

Location

Maps
 Livingston Island to King George Island.  Scale 1:200000.  Admiralty Nautical Chart 1776.  Taunton: UK Hydrographic Office, 1968.
 L.L. Ivanov. Antarctica: Livingston Island and Greenwich, Robert, Snow and Smith Islands. Scale 1:120000 topographic map. Troyan: Manfred Wörner Foundation, 2009.  (Second edition 2010)
Antarctic Digital Database (ADD). Scale 1:250000 topographic map of Antarctica. Scientific Committee on Antarctic Research (SCAR). Since 1993, regularly upgraded and updated.

See also
 List of Antarctic and subantarctic islands

References

External links
 Osenovlag Island. Copernix satellite image

Islands of Robert Island
Bulgaria and the Antarctic